Giochi per il mio computer, also known by the acronym GMC, was an Italian magazine about computer video games and every thing concerns this topic. In Italy it represented the leading magazine in its field and frequently sold more than 100,000 copies.

The internal structure was divided in eight sections:
 editorial, which concerns general video games world's topics
 column of readers' letters
 previews of the most expected games
 general reviews
 hardware section, including a column dedicated to solve readers' problems
 the so-called "next level", a section dedicated to mods, free games and bargains in general
 guide for the complete game, sold with the magazine monthly
 closing credits

GMC had frequent changes in its publisher: when first created, it was published by Il mio castello editore, in Autumn 2000 it was passed to a division of Future Publishing, Future Media Italy (with many other editions) and finally from March 2007, it was published by the Italian publishing house Sprea Media Italy.

Deus Ex leak
The magazine was involved in the leak of a preview copy of the new Deus Ex game, but was later found to have no responsibility.

List of numbers

External links 
 Giochi per il mio computer on Sprea Media Italy corporate site 
  Giochi per il mio computer Magazine Page

1997 establishments in Italy
2012 disestablishments in Italy
Defunct magazines published in Italy
Italian-language magazines
Magazines established in 1997
Magazines disestablished in 2012
Magazines published in Milan
Monthly magazines published in Italy
Video game magazines published in Italy